Skudai–Pontian Highway, Federal Route 5, is a highway in Johor, Malaysia that connects Skudai in Johor Bahru District in the east with the town of Pontian Kechil in Pontian District in the west. It is also known as Jalan Pontian (at Johor Bahru district side) and Jalan Johor (at Pontian district side). It is one of the only two federal roads that are paved with concrete (from Universiti Teknologi Malaysia interchange to Taman Sri Pulai junction) besides Jalan Batak Rabit–Sitiawan (also part of Federal Route 5 while other federal roads are paved with typical tarmac.

List of interchange/junction and towns

Expressways and highways in Johor